Michael Paschal Kitt (born 17 May 1950) is a former Irish Fianna Fáil politician who served as Leas-Cheann Comhairle of Dáil Éireann from 2011 to 2016, a Minister of State from 1991 to 1992, and from 2007 to 2009. He served as a Teachta Dála (TD) for the Galway East constituency from 1975 to 1977, 1981 to 2002, and 2007 to 2016. He was a Senator from 2002 to 2007, after being nominated by the Taoiseach and from 1977 to 1981 for the Administrative Panel.

Early life
Born in Tuam, County Galway, Kitt was educated St Jarlath's College, Tuam; St Patrick's College of Education, Dublin; University College Dublin and University College Galway. He qualified as a teacher before becoming involved in politics.

Politics
In 1975, following the death of his father, Michael F. Kitt, he was elected to succeed his father on Galway County Council. In the Galway North-East by-election on 4 March he was elected to the 20th Dáil, being returned on the first count with a 7% majority over the Fine Gael candidate Paul Connaughton Snr.

Kitt lost his Dáil seat at the 1977 general election but was subsequently elected to Seanad Éireann by the Administrative Panel, serving until 1981 as a member of the 14th Seanad. He was re-elected to the Dáil at the 1981 general election for the new Galway East and retained his seat until 2002.

During this period he served as a Minister of State at the Department of the Taoiseach for three months from November 1991 to February 1992. He lost his Dáil seat at the 2002 general election but was subsequently nominated by the Taoiseach to serve as a member of the 22nd Seanad. He was re-elected to the Dáil at the 2007 general election. In June 2007, he was appointed by Bertie Ahern as Minister of State at the Department of Foreign Affairs with responsibility for Overseas Development. In May 2008, when Brian Cowen succeeded as Taoiseach, he was appointed as Minister of State at the Department of the Environment, Heritage and Local Government with special responsibility for Local Services. He served in this position until April 2009 when he was dropped when Cowen reduced the number of junior ministers from 20 to 15.

On 31 March 2011, he was elected as Leas-Cheann Comhairle of Dáil Éireann, serving for the 31st Dáil.

He did not contest the 2016 general election and retired from politics.

Family
Michael Kitt comes from a political family. He is a son of Michael F. Kitt, who was a TD for various Galway constituencies (1948–1951 and 1957–1975), and a brother of Tom Kitt, a TD for Dublin South from 1987 to 2011, and of Áine Brady, a TD for Kildare North from 2007 to 2011. His brother-in-law Gerry Brady also served as TD for Kildare in 1982.

See also
Families in the Oireachtas

References

1950 births
Living people
Alumni of St Patrick's College, Dublin
Alumni of the University of Galway
Alumni of University College Dublin
Fianna Fáil senators
Fianna Fáil TDs
Irish schoolteachers
Michael Paschal
Local councillors in County Galway
Members of the 14th Seanad
Members of the 22nd Seanad
Members of the 20th Dáil
Members of the 22nd Dáil
Members of the 23rd Dáil
Members of the 24th Dáil
Members of the 25th Dáil
Members of the 26th Dáil
Members of the 27th Dáil
Members of the 28th Dáil
Members of the 30th Dáil
Members of the 31st Dáil
Ministers of State of the 26th Dáil
Ministers of State of the 30th Dáil
Nominated members of Seanad Éireann
People educated at St Jarlath's College
People from Tuam
Politicians from County Galway